Thakur Ramprasad Potai was an Indian politician who served as Member of Constituent Assembly of India. He also played role in making Indian Constitution.

Personal life 
He was born to Ghanshyam Singh Potai in 1923 in Kanker district. His childhood name was Pharso. He died on 6 October 1962.

References 

1923 births
1962 deaths
Members of the Constituent Assembly of India